Nuno Miguel Gomes Bentes Lampreia (born 27 September 1978), known as Gomes, is a Portuguese retired footballer who played as a defender.

He amassed Segunda Liga totals of 230 games and 27 goals over 11 seasons, mainly with Varzim.

Playing career
Gomes was born in Lisbon. An unsuccessful youth graduate from Sporting CP's famed youth system, he made his professional debut with F.C. Felgueiras on loan from Sporting CP, moving in January 2001 to S.C. Campomaiorense in what would be his first Primeira Liga experience, with relegation.

Gomes then returned for the following seven seasons to the Segunda Liga, with G.D. Chaves (two years) and Varzim SC. At the end of 2008–09, in which he scored seven league goals for the latter side, he had an unsuccessful trial with Luton Town of the English Football League Two, but eventually signed with U.D. Leiria which had recently returned to the second division.

After no competitive appearances for Leiria in the 2009–10 campaign with a serious injury in the knee, Gomes was released and joined second-tier club S.C. Covilhã. He retired at the age of 35 with a promotion to Cypriot first division, after two years in the Cypriot Second Division with as many teams.

Coaching career
Gomes began working as a youth manager in Cyprus, returning to Portugal in 2017 to take charge of C.D. Cova da Piedade's under-17 squad. The following year, he joined Chicago Fire FC as an assistant, later revealing that he got the job through his friend and former Varzim teammate Aleksandar Sarić, who worked at the American club as goalkeeper coach.

In December 2018, Gomes was appointed assistant manager at Chaves.

In August 2020 Gomes joined Reading Fc as assistant manager>

References

External links

1978 births
Living people
Footballers from Lisbon
Portuguese footballers
Association football defenders
Primeira Liga players
Liga Portugal 2 players
Segunda Divisão players
Sporting CP footballers
F.C. Felgueiras players
S.C. Campomaiorense players
G.D. Chaves players
Varzim S.C. players
U.D. Leiria players
S.C. Covilhã players
Cypriot Second Division players
Akritas Chlorakas players
AEK Kouklia F.C. players
Portugal youth international footballers
Portuguese expatriate footballers
Expatriate footballers in Cyprus
Portuguese expatriate sportspeople in Cyprus
Portuguese expatriate sportspeople in the United States